is a 2004 Japanese tokusatsu action comedy superhero film directed by Takashi Miike, written by Kankurō Kudō and stars Shō Aikawa as the main character, a superhero named "Zebraman".

A 2010 sequel, titled Zebraman 2: Attack on Zebra City, featured the addition of Masahiro Inoue of Kamen Rider Decade to the cast.

Plot
It is 2010. A failure as a 3rd grade teacher and a family man, Shinichi Ichikawa lives with his cheating wife, his teenage daughter who dates older men, and his son who is bullied because of his father's presence in the school. Escaping from everyday life, Shinichi secretly dresses up nightly as "Zebraman", the title character from an unpopular 1970's tokusatsu TV series he watched as a child before it was canceled after the seventh episode. As a result of meeting a wheelchair-using transfer student named Shinpei Asano, also a fan of Zebraman, Shinichi not only regains his love for teaching but also develops feelings for the boy's mother. At the same time, a rash of strange crimes and murders have been occurring around the school at which Shinichi teaches. On his way to Shinpei's house in his costume to give him a surprise, Shinichi fights a crab-masked serial killer whom he defeats when he starts exhibiting actual superpowers. Confronting more criminals who are possessed by a strange slime-based alien force, Shinichi learns that the Zebraman series was actually a cautionary prophecy of an actual alien invasion written by the school's principal, revealed to be an alien who refused to go through with the invasion and attempted to keep his kind from getting out from below the school before they kill him off and attack in full fury. Though he knows how the show ends, Shinichi defies his predestined fate as he is the only person who can stop the aliens from taking over the Earth. As a result, when the aliens emerge from the ground, the government informs the United States, which will perform an airstrike on the aliens. Realizing this, Shinichi learns of his powers and defeats the aliens.

Cast
Show Aikawa as Shinichi Ichikawa/Zebraman
Kyōka Suzuki as Kana Asano/Zebra Nurse
Naoki Yasukochi as Shinpei Asano
Atsuro Watabe as Oikawa
Koen Kondo as Segawa
Makiko Watanabe as Yukiyo Ichikawa
Yui Ichikawa as Midori Ichikawa
Yoshimasa Mishima as Kazuki Ichikawa
Ren Osugi as Kuniharu Kuroda
Teruyoshi Uchimura as Ippongi
Akira Emoto as Kitahara the Crab Man
Ryo Iwamatsu as Kanda
Yu Tokui as Pyromaniac
Yoji Boba Tanaka
Arata Furuta - Eggplant Vendor
Kumiko Asō as Clerk
Yoshihiko Hakamada
Miyako Kawahara
Hideki Sone
Masayuki Fukushima
Satoru Hamaguchi Midori's boyfriend
Hiroshi Watari - 1978 Zebraman

Other credits
Produced by
Shigeyuki Endō - planner
Kumi Fukuchi - planner
Akio Hattori - producer
Takashi Hirano - executive producer: TBS
Mitsuru Kurosawa - executive producer: Toei/Tôei
Makoto Okada - producer
Production Design: Akira Sakamoto
Sound Department: Yoshiya Obara - sound
CGI producer: Misako Saka
Lighting Director: Seiichirô Mieno

Manga
The movie screenplay was adapted into a five volume manga by Reiji Yamada. The manga told its own story, focusing on the relationship the main character has with his two children. Unlike the movie, Zebraman never gains any powers, he is just a man in a suit.

References

External links

 
 
GOO Movies

2004 films
2000s Japanese superhero films
Alien invasions in films
Films about shapeshifting
Films directed by Takashi Miike
Films set in 2010
Films set in the future
Films set in Yokohama
Films with screenplays by Kankurō Kudō
Japanese superheroes
Japanese superhero films
2000s superhero comedy films
Toei tokusatsu films
Tokyo Shock